The Imperial German Army  Zeppelin LZ 47 (LZ 77) was a P-class World War I zeppelin. Destroyed by enemy fire on 21 February 1916 in the Battle of Verdun, killing the crew of 15.

Operational history

The Airship took part in six attacks on England and France dropping  of bombs.

Destruction

Reports at the time indicated LZ 77 had searchlights, eight machine guns, two so-called 'revolver' guns in the top lookout post, was accompanied by fixed-wing aircraft and at least one other Zeppelin and had orders to bomb nearby railway lines.   Destroyed by enemy fire on 21 February 1916 on the opening day of the Battle of Verdun, killing the crew of 15.

Specifications

See also

List of Zeppelins

Bibliography 
Notes

References

Further reading

 

Airships of Germany
Hydrogen airships
Zeppelins
Aviation accidents and incidents in 1916
Accidents and incidents involving balloons and airships